Yizhar Nitzan Shai (born 16 July 1963) is an Israeli businessman and politician. He served as a member of the Knesset for Blue and White between 2019 and 2021, and as Minister of Science & Technology from 2020 to 2021.

Biography
Shai was born in kibbutz Ein HaShlosha to parents from Argentina. His family moved to Jerusalem in the mid-1960s, where he attended the Hebrew Gymnasium school. In 1981 he started his national service in the Israel Defense Forces, joining the Paratroopers Brigade and serving in the 1982 Lebanon War. He left the army in 1985 with the rank of lieutenant. He later gained an electrical engineering certificate from the Technion and subsequently worked in the high-tech sector. He established the Business Layers firm in 1998, serving as CEO until it was sold to Netegrity in 2003. In 2006 he joined Canaan Partners as a partner, working there until 2014 when he established Canaan Partners Israel.

Prior to the April 2019 elections he joined the Israel Resilience Party. After the party joined the Blue and White alliance, he was given the twentieth slot on the joint list; he was subsequently elected to the Knesset when the alliance won 35 seats. He was re-elected in the September 2019 and March 2020 elections. In May 2020 he was appointed Minister of Science and Technology. The following month he resigned from the Knesset under the Norwegian Law and was replaced by Hila Vazan. After resigning from his ministerial role in January 2021, he returned to the Knesset, replacing Ruth Wasserman Lande, who had been an MK for only four days. Prior to the 2021 elections he joined Telem. However, the party did not contest the elections and he lost his seat in the Knesset.

Shai is married with four children and lives in Tzoran-Kadima.

References

External links

1963 births
Kibbutzniks
People from Southern District (Israel)
People from Jerusalem
Technion – Israel Institute of Technology alumni
Israeli businesspeople
Members of the 21st Knesset (2019)
Members of the 22nd Knesset (2019–2020)
Israel Resilience Party politicians
Blue and White (political alliance) politicians
Living people
Israeli people of Argentine-Jewish descent
Members of the 23rd Knesset (2020–2021)
Ministers of Science of Israel
Telem (2019 political party) politicians